Lilipaly is a surname. Notable people with the surname include:

Carolyn Lilipaly (born 1969), Dutch television news presenter and actress
Stefano Lilipaly (born 1990), Dutch-Indonesian footballer